Coluber insulanus is a species of snake in the family Colubridae. It is commonly known as the Sarso Island racer.

Geographic range
The snake is found in the Saudi Arabia.

References 

Reptiles described in 1965
Taxa named by Robert Mertens
Reptiles of the Arabian Peninsula
Endemic fauna of Saudi Arabia